Ripley Castle is a Grade I listed 14th-century country house in Ripley, North Yorkshire, England,  north of Harrogate.

The house is built of coursed squared gritstone and ashlar with grey slate and stone slate roofs. A central two-storey block is flanked by a tower at one end and a three-storey wing at the other.

The castle has been the seat of the Ingilby baronets for centuries.

History 
Sir Thomas Ingleby (c. 1290–1352) married the heiress Edeline Thwenge in 1308/9 and acquired the Ripley Castle estate with its medieval manor house as her dowry. His oldest son, also called Thomas (1310–1369), saved the king from being gored by a wild boar whilst on a hunting expedition and was knighted in return with the boar's head symbol as his crest.

His descendant Sir John Ingleby (1434–1499) inherited the estate at the age of five from his father William and built the castle gatehouse, before becoming a monk at Mount Grace Priory, near Northallerton, and later the Bishop of Llandaff. His son Sir William Ingleby was raised by his deserted mother. Sir John's grandson, Sir William Ingleby (1518–1578), was High Sheriff of Yorkshire in 1564–65. Sir William added the tower to the building in 1548. Two of his sons were fervent Catholics on the run from the authorities. Francis, a priest, was caught, sentenced and hanged, drawn and quartered in York in 1586; David escaped to die on the Continent.

Sir William Ingleby (1546–1618) was knighted by James VI of Scotland when the king was en route to his coronation as James I of England in 1603. Later that year he captured one of the fugitive brothers of the Earl of Gowrie at Kirkby Malzeard. In 1605 he was involved in the Gunpowder Plot, allowing the plotters to stay at Ripley whilst they procured horses. One of the conspirators, Robert Winter was his nephew. Ingleby was arrested and charged with treason, but acquitted.

Sir William Ingleby (1594–1652) supported Charles I during the Civil War, and was made Baronet Ingleby in 1642. He fought at Marston Moor in 1644, when the King's forces were totally routed, making his escape to Ripley and hiding in a priest hole while Oliver Cromwell billeted himself there for the night. On the death of the 4th Baronet in 1772 the baronetcy became extinct but was revived in 1781 for his illegitimate son John (1758–1815).

Sir John undertook a major rebuild of the castle in 1783–86 by William Belwood but got into debt and fled overseas in 1794 for several years. During this time the estate was managed by its long-serving steward, Ralph Robinson, who sold timber from the estate to raise money. Sir John was High Sheriff for 1782–83 and MP for East Retford from 1790 to 1796. His son William (1783–1854) was a great eccentric, drinker and gambler and Member of Parliament (MP) for East Retford from 1807 to 1812 and High Sheriff in 1821. He adopted the surname of Amcotts-Ingilby (his mother was Elizabeth Amcotts) and demolished and rebuilt the village of Ripley, complete with a Continental-style hôtel de ville. Having no heir he left the Ripley estate to his first cousin, Henry John Ingilby. The baronetcy was extinguished a second time.

Henry was created 1st Baronet Ingilby of the third creation in 1866. Ripley then descended to the present 6th Baronet.

The castle is still privately owned, now by the 6th Baronet and his wife, Emma, Lady Ingilby, but open to the public for guided tours.

In October 2021, the castle was one of 142 sites across England to receive part of a £35-million injection from the government's Culture Recovery Fund.

The Yorkshire Television children's series The Flaxton Boys (1969–1973) used Ripley Castle as the fictional Flaxton Hall.

It was used in the 1976 Disney film Escape from the Dark, as the home of Lord Harrogate, played by Alastair Sim.

The BBC Television series Gunpowder (2017) used the castle as a location.

References

External links 

 Official website

Grade I listed buildings in North Yorkshire
Country houses in North Yorkshire
Grade I listed houses